Altamont is a census-designated place (CDP) and unincorporated community in Klamath County, Oregon, United States, southeast of Klamath Falls. As of the 2010 Census, the population was 19,257. All mailing addresses in Altamont are Klamath Falls addresses, although Altamont is outside of the city limits of Klamath Falls.

History
Altamont may have been named after a locally famous trotting horse named Altamont, by a prominent local horseman, Jay Beach. An Altamont post office was in operation from 1895 to 1902.

Geography
It is bordered to the north and west by the city of Klamath Falls, the county seat. Oregon Route 39 passes through the center of the community as South 6th Street and the Crater Lake Parkway, while Oregon Route 140 (Southside Expressway) runs along the southern edge of the community. OR 39 leads northwest into Klamath Falls and southeast  to the California border at Hatfield, while OR 140 leads east  to Lakeview and west  to White City near Medford.

Demographics

As of the census of 2000, there were 19,603 people, 7,777 households, and 5,420 families residing in the CDP. The population density was 2,248.5 people per square mile (868.0/km2). There were 8,315 housing units at an average density of 953.8 per square mile (368.2/km2).

The racial makeup of the CDP was:
 88.65% White
 0.64% African American
 3.52% Native American
 0.77% Asian
 0.14% Pacific Islander
 2.82% from other races
 3.47% from two or more races

6.76% of the population were Hispanic or Latino of any race.

There were 7,777 households, out of which:
 31.5% had children under the age of 18 living with them
 53.5% were married couples living together
 12.0% had a female householder with no husband present
 30.3% were non-families
 25.0% of all households were made up of individuals
 12.4% had someone living alone who was 65 years of age or older

The average household size was 2.51 and the average family size was 2.96.

The age distribution was:
 26.7% under the age of 18
 7.7% from 18 to 24
 25.8% from 25 to 44
 22.9% from 45 to 64
 16.8% who were 65 years of age or older

The median age was 38 years. For every 100 females, there were 94.9 males. For every 100 females age 18 and over, there were 90.2 males.

The median income for a household in the CDP was $31,831, and the median income for a family was $37,715. Males had a median income of $31,229 versus $22,495 for females. The per capita income for the CDP was $15,957. About 9.4% of families and 13.7% of the population were below the poverty line, including 19.4% of those under age 18 and 6.4% of those 65 or over.

References

Unincorporated communities in Klamath County, Oregon
Census-designated places in Oregon
1895 establishments in Oregon
Populated places established in 1895
Census-designated places in Klamath County, Oregon
Unincorporated communities in Oregon